The 1941 NYU Violets football team was an American football team that represented New York University as an independent during the 1941 college football season. In their eighth and final season under head coach Mal Stevens, the Violets compiled a 2–7 record and were outscored by a total of 243 to 47. The team played its home games at the Polo Grounds in Upper Manhattan, and Ohio Field and Yankee Stadium in The Bronx.

Schedule

References

NYU
NYU Violets football seasons
NYU Violets football
University Heights, Bronx